Ordzhonikidze may refer to:

Places

Armenia
Vahan, Armenia, formerly, Ordzhonikidze, a town

Azerbaijan
Orconikidze, Beylagan, Azerbaijan, formerly Ordzhonikidze, a village
Nərimankənd, Gadabay, Azerbaijan, also known as Ordzhonikidze, a village and municipality
Orconikidze, Shaki, Azerbaijan, also called Ordzhonikidze, a village

Russia
Ordzhonikidze, former name of the city of Vladikavkaz, the capital of North Ossetia-Alania

Kazakhstan
former name of the village of Denisovka, Kazakhstan

Ukraine
former name of the city of Yenakiieve, Ukraine, from 1937 to 1943 (as Ordzhonikidze, Stalino Oblast)
former name of the city of Pokrov, Ukraine
Ordzhonikidze, Crimea, an urban settlement of Feodosiya, Crimea (since the 2014 Russian annexation of Crimea fully controlled by Russia)

Georgia
Bambora, formerly Ordzhonikidze, a village in the Gudauta District of Abkhazia (status of Abkhazia is disputed)

Other uses
Ordzhonikidze (surname)
Ordzhonikidze, a Sverdlov-class cruiser
Ordzhonikidze Yard, another name for Baltic Shipyard in Leningrad

See also
Ordzhonikidzevsky (disambiguation)